Špaček is a quite common Czech surname (the feminine form is Špačková). It may be spelled without diacritics as Spacek. In Czech it means 'starling' (a bird) or 'cigarette butt'.

People
Among people named Špaček are:
 Daniel Špaček, Czech hockey player
 Jaroslav Špaček, Czech ice hockey player
 Josef Špaček Czechoslovak communist reformer; helped create the Prague Spring of 1968
 Otto Spacek, Czech World War II veteran
 Radim Špaček, Czech film director
 Sissy Spacek, American actress
 Steve Spacek, musician

Other uses
Spacek may also refer to: 
 Spacek s.r.o. of Hodonín, Czech Republic, the company behind the minimalist Spacek SD-1 Minisport aircraft.
 Spacek (band), a British electronic music band.
 Ulrika Spacek, a British musical group

Spatzek 
  (born 1959), Austrian actress
  (born 1956), Austrian actor

Czech words and phrases
Czech-language surnames

cs:Špaček